My Brother, My Sister, and I is an autobiographical novel written by Yoko Kawashima Watkins, a Japanese-American writer. It is the sequel to So Far from the Bamboo Grove and it tells the tale of Yoko's life as a refugee in Japan and how her family perseveres without losing faith despite false accusations, murder, sickness, and the fear of not being able to reunite with their father. It instantly starts in Japan, telling the story of their survival.

Bibliography

References

1996 American novels
American young adult novels
American autobiographical novels
Novels set in Japan
Japan in non-Japanese culture